Krosno possesses an airport with disused concrete runway that could serve as a City-Airport. Town authorities are planning to start the modernisation by 2012.

As of July 2019, there are indications of recreational use.

History
The airport was opened before the second World War, in 1932.

References

External Links
Official website

Airports in Poland
Buildings and structures in Podkarpackie Voivodeship
Krosno